A Colonial store may be:

 Colonial goods, stores selling goods from colonies
 Colonial Store, term used in the colony of South Australia; Thomas Gilbert (pioneer) was the first Colonial Storekeeper
 Colonial Stores, a former U.S. grocery store chain
 Home and Colonial Stores, a former U.K. grocery store chain